Jack McDonald (28 January 1930 – 7 May 2022) was an Australian rules footballer who played for the St Kilda Football Club.

A left-footed forward from Camden, he played for the Saints from 1949 to 1956.

He was St Kilda's leading goal-kicker in 1949, 1952 and 1955.

References

External links
 
 

1930 births
2022 deaths
Australian rules footballers from New South Wales
St Kilda Football Club players